Huai Thap Than is a district (amphoe) in the western part of Sisaket province, northeastern Thailand.

Geography
Neighboring districts are (from the north clockwise): Mueang Chan, Uthumphon Phisai, and Prang Ku of Sisaket Province, and Samrong Thap of Surin province.

History
The minor district (king amphoe) Haui Thap Than was established on 17 January 1977, when the four tambons, Huai Thap Than, Mueang Luang, Phak Mai, and Kluai Kwang, were split off from Uthumphon Phisai district. It started operations on 16 February with a temporary district office in temple (Wat) Phra Charangsan, which was replaced by a permanent office building in 1981. It was upgraded to a full district on 20 March 1986.

Administration
The district is divided into six sub-districts (tambons), which are further subdivided into 80 villages (mubans). Huai Thap Than is a township (thesaban tambon) which covers parts of tambon Huai Thap Than. There are a further six tambon administrative organizations (TAO).

References

External links
amphoe.com

Huai Thap Than